Ruth Sherman Tolman (October 9, 1893 – September 18, 1957) was an American psychologist.

Early life
Tolman was born in Washington, Indiana on October 9, 1893. Not much is known about her early life. She received her undergraduate degree in psychology from the University of California, Los Angeles in 1917. During her initial graduate studies at UCLA, she surveyed psychological variations in different groups of criminals. This is where she met her husband, Richard Tolman, a mathematical physicist and physical chemist who served as the dean of the graduate school at the time. Tolman, who moved to the California Institute of Technology in 1922, is best known for serving as vice chairman of the National Defense Research Committee (under chairman Vannevar Bush) and as a scientific advisor to Major General Leslie Groves of the Manhattan Project during World War II. They married in 1924 when she was thirty years old.

Career 

During her career, Tolman was a prominent figure in the subfield of clinical psychology. Following her marriage, she stayed on as a research associate and instructor at UCLA (1927-1929) before teaching at Occidental College (instructor of psychology; 1930-1932) and Scripps College (lecturer in psychology; 1934), also receiving her M.A. in psychology from Occidental in 1930. Shortly before completing her Ph.D. in clinical psychology at the University of California, Berkeley in 1937, she became the senior psychological examiner for the Los Angeles County Probation Department (1936-1940). While writing six books and helping to create an early treatment for post-traumatic stress disorder, she was also the first woman ever to be elected to the Society for the Psychological Study of Social Issues (SPSSI). There was much controversy that surrounded her being elected, as Richard Tolman's brother was the creator of the SPSSI.

Tolman was very confident in her abilities and did not attribute her success to her connection to her brother-in-law. She was proactive in helping other women achieve the same goals as she had. Throughout World War II, she served on a committee called the Service of Women Psychologists in the Emergency Committee on Psychology (ECP). The organization's purpose was to help prepare women psychologists to fill the role of male psychologists who were away, serving in the military, and to help address the discrimination felt by female psychologists.

As the war commenced, Tolman was recruited by government agencies that were then hiring psychologists. After the Tolmans temporarily relocated to Washington, D.C., she spent a year (1941-1942) as an associate social science analyst with the Program Survey Section of the Department of Agriculture. This led to a two-year stint (1942-1944) as a public opinion analyst with the Office of War Information. Her last assignment (1944-1945) was that of clinical psychologist with the Office of Strategic Services (OSS), which was the forerunner of the Central Intelligence Agency. The role required her to devise tests to assess the psychological stability of field agents. During this period, she began an affair with J. Robert Oppenheimer.

Following the war, she and her husband returned to Los Angeles. There, Tolman became head of clinical psychology training at the Veterans Administration's local office from 1946 to 1954, treating soldiers who were suffering from post-traumatic stress disorder (then characterized as "battle fatigue"). This effort greatly advanced her career and made her a noteworthy figure. From 1953 to 1957, she also served as a clinical professor of psychology at UCLA while maintaining an affiliation with the Veterans Administration's local Mental Hygiene Clinic (1954-1957).

Personal life 

Her personal life was not as well known as was her professional life. Although married to Richard Chace Tolman, she was alleged to have had an ongoing affair with his good friend, J. Robert Oppenheimer, the wartime head of the Los Alamos Laboratory and one of the figures credited with being the "father of the atomic bomb" for his role in the Manhattan Project. She was ten years older than Oppenheimer. During their wartime service, the Tolmans bought a house in Washington where Oppenheimer often stayed when he was called to the capital.

Her husband died of a heart attack in 1948. Some people contend that he died of a broken heart. However, the authors of the book, An Atomic Love Story, a chronicle of the lives of Robert Oppenheimer and the extraordinary women in his life, concluded: "it was not believed to have been sexual, only a close emotional bond and connection."

Ruth Sherman Tolman died in California, at the age of 64, on September 18, 1957, and was later buried in Woods Hole, Massachusetts.

References 

1893 births
1957 deaths
American women psychologists
20th-century American psychologists
American women scientists
University of California, Los Angeles alumni
20th-century American women